There are multiple amusement park attractions themed to King Kong.
 King Kong: 360 3-D currently at Universal Studios Hollywood
 King Kong Encounter previously at Universal Studios Hollywood
 Kongfrontation previously at Universal Studios Florida
  KONG currently at Morey's Piers
 Skull Island: Reign of Kong currently at Islands of Adventure

Universal Parks & Resorts attractions by name
King Kong